A surface, as the term is most generally used, is the outermost or uppermost layer of a physical object or space. It is the portion or region of the object that can first be perceived by an observer using the senses of sight and touch, and is the portion with which other materials first interact. The surface of an object is more than "a mere geometric solid", but is "filled with, spread over by, or suffused with perceivable qualities such as color and warmth".

The concept of surface has been abstracted and formalized in mathematics, specifically in geometry. Depending on the properties on which the emphasis is given, there are several non equivalent such formalizations, that are all called surface, sometimes with some qualifier, such as algebraic surface, smooth surface or fractal surface.

The concept of surface and its mathematical abstraction are both widely used in physics, engineering, computer graphics, and many other disciplines, primarily in representing the surfaces of physical objects. For example, in analyzing the aerodynamic properties of an airplane, the central consideration is the flow of air along its surface. The concept also raises certain philosophical questions—for example, how thick is the layer of atoms or molecules that can be considered part of the surface of an object (i.e., where does the "surface" end and the "interior" begin),  and do objects really have a surface at all if, at the subatomic level, they never actually come in contact with other objects.

Perception of surfaces

The surface of an object is the part of the object that is primarily perceived. Humans equate seeing the surface of an object with seeing an object. For example, in looking at an automobile, it is normally not possible to see the engine, electronics, and other internal structures, but the object is still recognized as an automobile because the surface identifies it as one. Conceptually, the "surface" of an object can be defined as the topmost layer of atoms. Many objects and organisms have a surface that is in some way distinct from their interior. For example, the peel of an apple has very different qualities from the interior of the apple, and the exterior surface of a radio may have very different components from the interior. Peeling the apple constitutes removal of the surface, ultimately leaving a different surface with a different texture and appearance, identifiable as a peeled apple. Removing the exterior surface of an electronic device may render its purpose unrecognizable. By contrast, removing the outermost layer of a rock or the topmost layer of liquid contained in a glass would leave a substance or material with the same composition, only slightly reduced in volume.

In mathematics

In the physical sciences

Many surfaces considered in physics and chemistry (physical sciences in general) are interfaces. For example, a surface may be the idealized limit between two fluids (the surface of the sea) or the idealized boundary of a solid (the surface of a ball). In fluid dynamics, the shape of a free surface may be defined by surface tension. However, they are surfaces only at macroscopic scale. At microscopic scale, they may have some thickness. At atomic scale, they do not look at all as a surface, because of holes formed by spaces between atoms or molecules.

Other surfaces considered in physics are wavefronts. One of these, discovered by Fresnel, is called wave surface by mathematicians.

The surface of the reflector of a telescope is a paraboloid of revolution.

Other occurrences:
 Soap bubbles, which are physical examples of minimal surfaces
 Equipotential surface in, e.g., gravity fields
 Earth's surface
 Surface science, the study of physical and chemical phenomena that occur at the interface of two phases
 Surface metrology
 Surface wave, a mechanical wave
 Atmospheric boundaries (tropopause, edge of space, plasmapause, etc.)

In computer graphics

One of the main challenges in computer graphics is creating realistic simulations of surfaces. In technical applications of 3D computer graphics (CAx) such as computer-aided design and computer-aided manufacturing, surfaces are one way of representing objects.  The other ways are wireframe (lines and curves) and solids.  Point clouds are also sometimes used as temporary ways to represent an object, with the goal of using the points to create one or more of the three permanent representations.

References

 
Geometric shapes
Broad-concept articles